Saint Paul is a civil parish of Antigua and Barbuda, located in the central−southern area of Antigua island. It had a population of 9,004 in 2018.

St. Paul's Anglican Church, the parish church of Saint Paul, is located in Falmouth.

History

Sugar Mills

Barrel Beef Estate 
It was owned by the Fredericks family before the government took control of it in 1970. Today, it is a component of Liberta. It is not known when the name was changed to Barrel Beef, but the Frederick family always used that name for their business. They bought the property in the early 1900s, and for the next several decades it functioned as a modest sugar plantation under their ownership until the 1970s, when sugar production came to an end.

Southwest Liberta include both the western portion of Patterson's (#155) and the land that formerly belonged to the Barrel Beef Estate. It is generally accepted that the Liberta neighborhood known as Barrel Beef was the first part of the hamlet to be inhabited by people. With the acquisition of Barrel Beef by the government and the construction of the Liberta Primary School on a portion of that land, other sections of the property were opened up for public use for recreational activities. Due to the fact that the existing police station at Horsford Hill had outlived its usefulness, the government decided to construct a new police station on the north section of what was formerly known as Barrel Beef. In subsequent years, a medical facility was erected. This land is level when you first enter it, but it gradually rises to the south and west, where it becomes very hilly.

Barter’s 
Doig's Estate (#153) is located on the west side of Barter's Estate, and Howard's Estate (#150) is located on the north side of Barter's Estate. Both of these estates are located just off Rendezvous Bay. Both Doig's and Barter's are notoriously difficult to access due to the challenging topography that surrounds the Bay. There is a pathway that leads north through a break in the hills to Howard's, and from there it continues into the community of Swetes. On the right, it goes by the remnants of the sugar mill that belonged to Barter, and on the left, it goes by the ruins of Doig's as well as a pond. Hiking from Horsford Hill through Dimsdale (#151) and turning left to go to Barter's or right to go to Howard's and Swetes is an alternative route that can be taken.

There is also a dirt road that is regularly graded that goes by the Spring Hill Riding Stables and provides access to the unspoiled Rendezvous Beach. This beach is a favorite destination for tourists, and they can also reach it by embarking on a daylong boat excursion.

Only a few of the massive base stones of the sugar mill at Barter's remain in place, but the structure as a whole has completely collapsed. Buildings that have been demolished are indicated by piles of rubble, and the remains of the buff house may be seen on the hills to the east. There is no evidence whatsoever of the gravestones that Sir George Walter mentioned back in 2005.

Reynolds Barter, a planter from Antigua, is mentioned in a document dated 1675. a will dated the 10th of August in 1675. If my cousin Bridget Sampson and her husband Chas. Baldwin are obedient to my wife Agnes, I will give one heifer to each of them. My plantation in Falmouth is yours, William Barter, my son. To my son Jas: Make a deal for a black man. Everything will go to my two boys when they become 21. Will dated August 8, 1755, written by James Barter of St. Paul's, Antigua, Gent. "reciting my indebtedness, I surrendered to the abovementioned trustees all of my plantation which was called Rendezvous Bay, with the benefit of redemption; nevertheless, no provision was made for the progress of my younger children." He then continues, saying that he will "further provide for his wife and children." "In the year 1755, he sold the entirety of his property at Rendezvous Bay to the Trustees Thomas Elmes, Edward Horne, and William Maxwell. Affidavit of Nathaniel Marchant, in which he states that on September 10, 1709, he was present in the room in which Captain James Barter's wife was unwell when soldiers under the command of Governor Parke searched the home. James Barter also deposes." "Barters belonged to the Ex'ors of Thomas Warner and had 250 acres, 58 slaves, 39 cattle, 16 mules, a cattle mill, dwelling house, and other miscellaneous things..." In 1787, the property comprised a total of 250 acres, 58 slaves, 39 cattle, 16 mules, a cattle mill, and a dwelling building. Thomas Warner, an English gentleman, advertised the sale of his plantation in 1777 under the name "Osborne's or Barter's." "I always wondered why I was so "soup" for politics until I found out that my father Norris Walter in 1932 collaborated with two "Foreigners" to seek to organize a trade union. Since then, I have been able to answer my own question of why I am so "soup" for politics. Together, they formed and registered The Antigua Workingmen's Association, and Harold Tobias Wilson was the first person to represent Antigua in talks held overseas (in Dominica) to initiate a Federation of the West Indies in 1914. There was no legal basis that would have supported it, but he joined with his friend Luther George, and recruited Berkley Davis, (a building contractor a Barbadian), and Harold Tobias Wilson, (the editor of the Magnet Newspaper, a Barbadian):" The groundbreaking work done by the Antigua Workingmen's Association was rendered pointless when the Moyne Commission made the suggestion to organize a trade union. Yet, Norris Walter was there at the Cathedral Schoolroom during the pivotal event that marked the beginning of the Antigua Trades and Labor Union. He averted disaster at Reginald Steven's Jewelry Store located on High Street by applying pressure to convince Stevens to overcome his resistance and agree to serve as president of the newly formed union. It was his idea that the new Union should get involved in politics, run candidates for office, and win elections in order to gain the political power necessary to combat the plantocracy. 1950: "The Buff house was destroyed by the hurricanes that year, while another house in the area was picked up and sent into the dense forest, where it shattered into a thousand pieces." My dad, Norris Walter, passed away when he was in his forties, leaving my mom to raise ten kids on her alone. I was the oldest of the bunch. Despite the fact that he had made it possible for me to continue my education in Canada, as the oldest child, I was responsible for some things. On Friday, I received my diploma from The Antigua Boys Grammar School, and on Monday, I moved into Barter's in order to manage the estate, which had a problem with cattle being stolen from it. We had goats, cattle, horses, mules, and donkeys as our animals. During the harvest season, we sold the goats in exchange for "lifts." "The gravestones of the Barter family, including those of Maj. James Barter, Elizabeth, and Anne, can still be seen and are located around 75 yards to the northwest of the mill. All three of the Barter women passed away while they were in their twenties during the middle of the 1700s. Even though the tombs had been disturbed in the search for relics, the ledger may still be read. On the road that leads down to Rendezvous By, there is a place called "Harris Leapt" that has a reputation for being a haunted location. It got its name after an incident in which Harris' carriage flipped over when the horses were startled by a loud noise. Later on, George Walter was thrown from his horse in the same location when his horse was frightened; the horse's ears went up in a vertical position, and the horse ran away. A portion of the slope that is particularly steep and is located closer to the base of the hill has had some of its surface area concreted over. Mr. Henderson paid $30,000 in cash in the form of $5 bills, all of which were placed in a huge bag, to buy the adjoining property of Ding Dong Nook from Henry (Liberta) and Bonnie Frances. Ding Dong Nook is of historical significance in Antigua and the Antiguans. After some time had passed, George Walter paid Henderson a total of $500,000 to purchase the land from him. Sir George Herbert Walter was the second premier of Antigua and Barbuda and the founder of the Antigua Workers Union. He also served as the governor of the island nation of Barbuda. In 1960, he was given the position of general secretary of the Antigua Trades and Labor Union (ATLU), which he held until 1967. In 1967, he was dismissed from his position when Vere Cornwall Bird accused him of conspiring to overthrow the government. Antigua Workers' Union (AWU) was established in response to demands for a new union, and Walter was appointed as the organization's general secretary. Seventy-five percent of ATLU members subsequently joined the AWU. The Australian Workers' Union (AWU) gave birth to a new political party in 1968 called the Progressive Labour Movement (PLM). Once Walter became the political leader of the PLM, he resigned his post with the union. Four years after the colony had become a British dependent with domestic government, in 1971, he led it to victory in elections, defeating Bird in the process. He also defeated Bird. 2012: This is the location of a sizable and significant Indigenous community, and before any development can take place here, it is hoped that the area will first be examined in the near future.

Bodkin’s 
When it was found in 2002 while on a hike, the grave of John Hawksley, Esq., who had passed away in 1819 and had been married to the eldest daughter of Paul Horseford, was still surrounded by an iron railing. The grave is located on the slope of a hill below the highest point on the hill, which is most likely where the house was located. According to a letter that was taken from Caribbeana, there are milled stones and remains on the hillside that point to the fact that many buildings had previously been in the area. These buildings appear to be the sugar factory. On this spot, which is just down the road from Willis Freeman's mansion, there is no longer a mill that is in operation. After being purchased by the Syndicate Estates in 1943, the Bodkins property became a part of Morris Looby's (#141) adjacent property. Mary Osborn and Dominick Bodkin, who were both alive in 1693 and 1705, tied the knot in 1693. John Hawkesley, Esq., on the Estate of the Honorable Paul Horseford, often known as "Bodkin's," in the year 1819 (buried). 1829: This estate comprised a total of 492 acres and 216 slaves in the year 1829. 1851: The Bodkin's of 412 acres are shown to belong to K. B. Osborn, M.D., according to the Antigua Almanac. 1852: Keane Osborn, MD was the owner of Orange Valley, which consisted of 735 acres in St. Mary's, Bodkin's, which consisted of 412 acres in St. Paul's, Room's, which consisted of 318 acres in St. Paul's, Paynter's, which consisted of 272 acres, and Carlisle's, which consisted of 388 acres in St. George's. 1864: In the year 1864, Bodkins was up for sale and included a windmill and other amenities... 80 head of livestock and 61 acres of sugar cane are being offered. Dominick Bodkin, a planter from Antigua, passed away on May 4th, 1702. "A power of attorney document addressed to my wife and my brother-in-law Keane Osborne, titled "Cisterns at English Harbour laid out, 1 1/2 acres bought of Mrs. Tho. Bodkin of Ireland, Gent., surveyed 25th Oct., 1787."" An Act to invent a certain tract of land at English Harbour, belonging to Thomas Bodkin of the Kingdom of Ireland in His Majesty, His Heirs and Successors, for certain public uses, and for appraising and valuing the same, and paying the owner thereof. "No.197. An Act to invent a certain tract of land at English Harbour, belonging to Thomas Bodkin of the Kingdom of Ireland in His Majesty, His Heirs and Successors. Dated the 23rd day of January in 1748." 2004: In 2004, a bulldozer that was clearing the hill unearthed a grave that belonged to John Hawksley Esq. and partially damaged it. The following inscription, which is somewhat lengthy, could only be read by it with a tremendous deal of effort and difficulty. "Sacred to the Memory of John Hawksley, Esquire?" The oldest son of Archibald Hawksley, of "Dubline square." After a few months of illness that he endured with exemplary patience and resignation, the Late Governor of the National Bank of Ireland and Anne, his wife, were married on the 27th day of July 1815. Amelia Alice Horseford, the eldest daughter of the Honorable Paul Horseford, Attorney General of this Island, and Amelia his wife died on the 18th day of January 1819 of a pulmonary attack. He was 32 years old. He was dispatched from England to travel to this country in the fruitless hope of delaying the inevitable outcome of his untimely demise. The mortal remains of this man are stored away in this crypt. Within the confines of our brief but respectable existence/ ——— and a strong sense of honor, all of which, in combination with his hospitable and upbeat demeanor, made him the delight of his companions. ———– and other forms of perfection ———/——————————— loving, tender, and kind. ——— Husband ——— was an example to all of his relations in terms of a healthy and stable domestic life. His career was certainly brief —-alas, how brief — but it was pleasant and sweetly prosperous in his endeavors; it was approved by all ——–; those who knew him best loved him the most; and it was short. He was given the authorization to collect the entirety of/any portion of the award. The remaining portions of the inscription were buried. An example of the 'flowery' language that was common during that time period; it's hard to believe that all of this could have been written on a single tombstone. Caribbeana. A passage taken from a letter written by Arch. Spooner pertaining to the Burial Site at Dickie Hill (#21 Renfrew's)

"I have excluded from the following intriguing letter a lengthy M.I. to John Hawksley Esq., from a gravestone at the west end of a small damaged and empty crypt, which is located on the pasture area at the southern end of the Bodkins sugar plant. The M.I. is practically a duplicate of the one that is on the tablet at St. Paul's Church (Antigua it, 87), which records that the burial took place at Bodkins. Mr. Spooner's notes also relate to a burial-ground that was unknown to me. "The M.I. is practically a duplicate of the one that is on the tablet at St. Paul's Church. ie. Burial Cemetery at Dickie Hill."

On August 1st, 1943, Gunthorpes Estate Ltd. was transformed into a 'new' corporation that was given the name Antigua Syndicate Estates Ltd. (for further information, see #64 Gunthorpes). Morris Looby, Bodkin's, Parry's, and the Diamond were all purchased for a total of 7,400 pounds as part of the Bennett-Bryson and R.S.D. Goodwin estates. These properties were owned two-thirds by Bennett-Bryson and one-third by Goodwin. Acts that were passed in 1943 include the Antigua and Barbuda Syndicate Estates Limited (Vesting) Act and the Lands of Antigua and Barbuda Sugar Factory Limited Act. All of that piece or parcel of land that is included in Bodkin's and is described in Certificate of Title No. 2811943, which was issued on August 3, 1943, and entered in Register Book Q Folio 28, minus an area that is around 1,395 acres. In 1956, the government paid $96 per acre to purchase 375.218 acres of land from Syndicate Estates in order to fulfill the requirements of the Land Settlement program. It was discovered that as a result of peasants occupying the land, ASE offered 27 12 acres of tenanted land in addition to 5 acres of estate cane land (#16) at a price of $120 per acre. Due to its location in a remote part of the estate, the loss was not regarded as being particularly significant. Antigua Syndicate Estate, Ltd., minutes, (Bodkins, a section of Morris Looby's) Antigua Syndicate Estate, Ltd. Reports on the estates owned by Mr. Gordon in the West Indies; also includes BODKIN (views 706), one of 10 views of the island.

William Clark's "Ten Views in the Island of Antigua" features an aquatint that was created by him. A scene from Bodkin's Estate showing a group of enslaved people cultivating sugar cane is depicted in the aquatint. Slaves of all ages, including men, women, and children, may be seen toiling away in the field. They would have put in a full day's labor, beginning at 6 in the morning and ending at 6 in the evening, with only a brief break for lunch in between. They were under the watchful eye of a master or overseer, who can be seen in this picture sporting a black hat and brandishing a whip. The labor they were doing was strenuous. They would have been forced to labor more diligently under the threat of the whip. The viewer is standing on Bodkin's Estate and facing south; in the distance, they can see out Monks Hill Military Station. This structure, which also goes by the name George Fort, was constructed over the course of sixteen years, from 1689 until 1705, and its primary purpose was to protect Falmouth, which was the capital of Antigua at the time, from assaults by both the French and the Arawaks. Although it was designed to be a safe haven for women and children, it had the capacity to house the whole population of the island at the time, which was approximately 1,200 people.

Buckshorne's 
This mill can be found behind and up the hill to the west of St. Barnabas' Church. It is totally encircled by the village of Liberta at this point. There is a mention of the 300-acre property known as "Freeman's Rest" that is located in St. Paul's Parish. It's possible that this belongs to Buckshorne. In the year 1734, Captain Paul Horsford of Falmouth sold 61 acres, 3 shillings, and 17 pence to Dr. Buckthorne, a planter who surveyed the land. In the year 1743, Joseph Buckshorn, junior submits a petition requesting the sum of £124, which is his compensation for his position as deputy storekeeper at Great George Fort. 1787: Buckshorne's Plantation had a total area of 250 acres in that year. Tankard's forms the northern boundary, Gale the eastern boundary, Horsford the southern boundary, and Kirby the western boundary. In the year 1815, "Sir John Tyrrell.... and Charles Cheshire of Antigua absolutely in fee simple a piece of land in the Parish of St. Paul and division of Falmouth called "Buckhornes," and formerly cultivated as a sugar plantation, contained 200 acres bounded N. with land by Adm. Richard Tyrell dec., E. by land late of Capt. Grant Gordon but now of Margaret Harcum, S. by lands of the said Samuel. According to the Antigua Almanac from the year 1851, Buchshorne owned 200 acres of land that belonged to Mrs. Gilchrist's heirs. Hewlester A. Samuel, Sr. is the author of "The Founding of the Town of Liberta." Joseph Buckshorne, Dr. Buckshorne's son, served at one point as the deputy store keeper at Great Fort George. On September 22nd, 1743, he sent a petition to the government demanding payment for his work as deputy storekeeper. A little over a year after that, both he and his father passed away. Following their passing, Barry Buckhorne remained in charge of managing the estate. Buckshorne was already a part of the Tyrrell Estate before the Willis family sold the land to Sir John Tyrrell, therefore it was not necessary for him to buy it. Since they had inherited the estate from the Buckthornes, Freemans, and Willises, they were able to exercise influence over the land even if they were not physically there prior to John Tyrrell's purchase of it from the Willises. After the term of the lease was ended, they decided to sell the property to the Cheshires. Before selling the estate to the Gilchrists, the Cheshires did not maintain it for very long at all before parting ways with it. Domingo Techeira became the new owners of the estate after the Gilchrists came to the conclusion, along with the majority of the previous owners, that running the property as a sugar plantation was not feasible from an economic standpoint. In the 1940s and 1950s, Mr. Norman Techeira made the decision to sell the estate in parcels to tenants or anyone else who was interested. As a result, the estate was no longer a sugar-producing plantation and instead became a residential neighborhood. The Techeira family owned the estate for almost a century. It quickly developed into one of the most populated parts of the village. The original borders of Buckhorne's, as recorded in the original bill of sale, do not correspond to the current set of boundaries for the property. Buckshorn begins at the entrance to the northernmost part of the village and continues along the west side of the Liberta Main Road all the way up to Bridge Gut. On the west side of Buckshorn, it is bounded by Richmond Estate and a portion of Howard's estate. Barrell Beef is located to the south, Tyrrell is located to the north, and Table Hill Gordon is located to the east. On the southern side of the estate is one of the valleys that has the greatest depth in the surrounding area. The fact that this valley is surrounded on all sides by hills and is the recipient of the water that runs off of these hills into the valleys contributes to the fact that the soil in this valley is particularly rich. Mount Williams Bluff, which was the big mansion for the estate and where the overseer used to dwell in the past, will not be forgotten by anyone who is familiar with the village. When the estate stopped producing sugar, there was no longer a significant need for the entire great house. As a result, it was divided into two sections: one was used to house the resident owner and his family, and the other was used to rent out for entertainment purposes until the business went out of business. The foundation of one of the original windmills that was utilized on the estate back when it was engaged in the manufacture of sugar may be found in this particular area of Buckshorn. It is visible while traveling along the east-west road on Buckshorn, which is also referred to as Quarry Hill. If you are interested in the geology of the hamlet, the region around Quarry Hill is another item of interest in Buckshorn that you should check out. It is home to a substantial amount of green limestone, which is a natural feature of the island. One of the many slaves who worked on Buckthorne's estate was so disobedient and belligerent that his master had his master order him to have one of his legs severed. Cane Returns for the 1941 Crop at the Antigua Sugar Plant, Ltd., at Buckshorne in 1941. Expected to be 210 tons, with peasants working 18 acres of the estate's land, and 222 tons of cane being provided.

Burke's 
There is evidence that this estate transitioned from using water power to using steam power, as the mill has been truncated and transformed into a cistern. John Burke's marriage contract was signed on March 13, 1745, and he was still alive in 1756. Burke's of 450 acres in the Falmouth Division of St. Paul's Parish was owned by him. "Indenture 1767. All of that plantation located in the Parish of St. Paul was sold by John Burke to George Crump, who thereafter assigned it to his successors. ..... known as Burke's Plantation, which is currently in the ownership and occupation of James Athill of Antigua, who is a surgeon, and which encompasses 450 acres...." When it seems impossible for John Burke to sell an estate that is in the property of James Athill to George Crump, things have a tendency to get quite complex for everyone involved. "Indenture 1768 John Burke (sell) slaves for Amand and Charity Bonevil." Those are the words from the document. "Indenture entered into on the 17th day of August in the year 1770 between John Burke of Antigua, Esq. and Frances, his wife, on the one part, and George Savage of Antigua, Esq., on the other half. whereas on the seventeenth day of August of the year just gone, a fire broke out in the town of St. John's in Antigua, which burnt the buildings that had been erected on a piece of land that will be specified further on to be transferred.... etc." 1786: A gravestone that reads, "Here Lyeth the Corpse of Mr. John Burke oblit 8 October 1786, Aged 50 years and also three children, Mary, Thomas & George," was placed in the churchyard of St. John in that year. 1829 At the time, Burke's plantation consisted of 374 acres and 170 slaves. 1851: The Burke's Land Survey shows that Samuel Nelson owned 364 acres, according to the Antigua Almanac. In 1895, when James Maginley passed away, he was a very wealthy man who owned Glebe House in Killukin, Ireland as well as other plantations on the island of Antigua. He was a former president of the United States. The estate of Burke (#133), which is located in the parish of St. George; Sanderson's, which is located in the parish of St. Peter; Long Lane, which is located in the parish of St. Paul; Comfort Hall, which is located in the parish of St. Paul; and Lavington's, which is located in the parish of St. Paul (#121). Annie Letitia (Holbrow) and Isabella Maud (Thomas) were James Maginley's daughters, while Isabella Maud (Thomas) and John William Arthur were his son's children. When he passed away while living at Burkes estate, his estates and fortune in Antigua were split among his three children, but he bequeathed his Killukin House and the surrounding acres to his son. He had been living at Burkes estate for many years. It is believed that he may have bought Burkes in 1865 before he invited his wife to join him, which would suggest that he had been working and saving for a total of seven years prior to making the invitation. The Burke family made their home on an estate called Burkes. In the year 1872, Burkes and Lavingtons were responsible for the production of 27 barrels and 48 puncheons of molasses in addition to 66 hogsheads and 5 tierces of sugar. (a hogshead is roughly equivalent to 16–18 hundredweight, and a tierce is one-third of that amount). Two of the horses at Burkes were put to use in a carriage that was driven by the women of the house, while the other two were put to service in a buggy that was driven almost entirely by James Maginley. A hack was the fifth horse in the lineup. Even though it wasn't very dramatic, the social life at Burkes was always happening. There were just seven days in the first three months of the year 1889 in which there was no social engagement. On January 5th, "it was extremely wet and we did not go to Gilbert's but amused ourselves at home," and again on January 10th, but was "saved by having Jem Goodwin in the evening for tea," since "it was very wet and we did not go to Gilbert's but amused ourselves at home." On January 9, "The Maginleys came down to spend some time with us. That evening, we welcomed Mary Jane, Eva, and Bobby G (Goodwin) for supper. The next afternoon, Jem, Thomas, and Jane joined us for tea. Had a few steps by way of dancing earlier that evening." "On the 20th, we hosted James R. and Mrs. Gilpin for dinner, and on the 6th of February, Mrs. Thompson and Mrs. Hart paid us a visit. Mrs. Goodwin, Mary Jane, and Miss Johnston, in addition to Mrs. Clark and Aunt Hannah, were among others who stopped by as well. The following day, on the 15th, Maud, my father, and I attended a ball. We did quite a bit of dancing, particularly Maud with the little H. We did not return to our house till the early morning hours. The following day, we were both pretty exhausted after the ball, which was our first." In later notes, they mention going to places like Gilbert's, where they frequently played tennis and conducted musical evenings, as well as Cassada Gardens, Vernon's, and The Gardens. It was common practice to ride horses. The young ladies rode in a carriage that was enormous and stately, and they were accompanied on their journey by a coachman and two black horses. It was a common opinion that the vehicle should have been acquired by the Government House because it was superior to all others that were available on the island. Moreover, the church was an important social institution. In 1921, the total area that included Burke's was 1091 acres. The Maginleys were one example of a recently immigrated family that profited from the statute in the year 1872. John and Robert, two brothers, immigrated to the United States from Ireland some time between the years 1852 and 1872. The 1852 edition of the Almanac does not show them as estate owners, but the 1872 edition does. The legend has it that they initially worked as apprentice planters or managers, but they didn't waste any time and started buying up estates for themselves. By the year 1878, they had amassed approximately 4,500 acres of land through a combination of judicial and private sales, making them the most significant landowners in all of Antigua. The majority of their estates, which included Comfort Hall, Gilbert's, Long Lane, Lavington, Lyons, Willis Freemans, and Burke's/LaRoche/Table Hill, were located in the more fertile southeastern region. In 1891, when the court was used once more, these estates had been supplemented by Cedar Hill and Sanderson's, bringing the total number of estates to nine. John was a prominent member of the plantocracy and served for twenty years on the Legislative Council, in addition to serving on a number of governmental boards, and he was also a public servant. Nelson Burke (1829 Samuel Nelson?) was the owner of Burke's, and he was known for his cruel treatment of his slaves. The dungeon was located to the east of the La Roche Hills, and the walls of this structure may still be seen today. As a slave reached the end of his useful life, they would place him in a barrel that was filled with nails and then roll the barrel down Bull Tree Hill. The Burke family generously donated a plot of land on their estate for the Moravians to use in the construction of their second church. In 1773, construction began on the first Moravian Church. They traveled towards Falmouth to a hill called Bailey Hill that was owned by an Irishman named Joseph Bailey, and he granted them land when they discovered that Burke's was not available. On Bailey Hill, approximately in the year 1774, the second Moravian Church was constructed. The village of Liberta was established as a result of the relocation of Buxton Estate from its previous location on Bailey Hill to its new location here. On Easter Sunday, the Adventist Church at Grace Hill caught fire, and everyone from Liberta traveled there to lend assistance. The church was completely destroyed. Bethel Adventist Church is the name of the new church that was constructed on Tyrell's Estate. On a hill that provides a view of the ghut below Liberta and Brooke's Estate is where Mr. Ralph built his home. At the beginning, the missions were referred to as "stations." The original one was constructed in 1761 by the estate of Mr. Gamble. Following that, there was a continuation of the building boom with the establishment of Falmouth (1774), Gracehill (1782), Old Road Town (1797), Gracebay (1822), Newfield (1818), Mt. Joy (1821), Cedar Hall (1822), Seaview Farm (1830), Gracefield (1839), Greenbay (1845), and Johnson's Point (1860). Within a century following the founding of the first Moravian station, the island of Antigua was covered in these stations, which frequently included schools for enslaved children as well as adults. This happened within the span of just one hundred years. The students had classes both during the day and in the evening. Schools might be found on the estates of Mount Pleasant, Bizzards, Drehill, Popeshead, Casada Gardens, Galley Bay, McKinnons, Winthorp's, Coates, Sir George Thomas, Gaynor's, Gibbs, Bannacha, and Skerrett's, among others. In a short amount of time, "Education" and "Moravian" came to be nearly synonymous with one another. Cane returns for the 1941 crop were submitted by Antigua Sugar Plant Ltd. in 1941. Burkes. Cane was delivered in 3774 tons, at a rate of 20.75 tons per acre, yielding an estimated total of 4460 tons, with the estate covering 152 acres and the peasants working 60 acres. On August 1, 1943, Gunthorpes Estates Ltd. was transformed into a "new" corporation that was later given the name Antigua Syndicate Estates Ltd. (see #64 Gunthorpes for more information). Sandersons, Long Lane/Lavington's/ Ffrye's, Burke's/LaRoche/Willis Freemans, Jolly Hill (Jolly Hill, Blubber Valley, Ffrye's, Montrose, Yorke's and the Cove), Hawes and Mercer's Creek, Cochranes and Thomases were all part of the Bennet-Bryson estates, which were purchased for £39,000. Antigua Syndicates Estates, Ltd. was given ownership of each and every estate that belonged to the Bennett-Bryson family. The minutes of the Antigua Syndicate from 1952 reveal that Norris Abbott served as Manager that year, and Ronald Baynes was appointed to the role of Overseer. 1955: In 1955, Burkes was part of Group A under the supervision of Superintendent N.C. Abbott, along with Lavingtons and Delaps, for a combined total of 541.1 acres. On Tuesday, July 12, 1955, a fire entirely destroyed the manager's residence. The incident took place in 1955. Due to the fact that Mr. Norris Abbott, the Manager, had lost all of his personal goods in the fire, a loan in the amount of $1,200 was provided to him. During the night of the fire, Mr. and Mrs. A. Chambers of All Saints offered Mr. Abbott and his family a safe haven in their home. It was requested that Mr. I.E.A. Barnes provide a quotation for the construction of a house according to the Company's plan, the price of which was 20,000 dollars. 30th of December, 1969: The Lands of Antigua & Barbuda Sugar Factory Limited and The Antigua & Barbuda Syndicate Estates Limited (Vesting) Act. All of that portion of land that is located in Burke's, La Roche's, Willis Freeman's, and Table Hill and totals roughly 769,999 acres, as stated in Certificate of Title No.211944, which was issued on February 17, 1944 and registered in Register Book Q Folio 47.

Cabadge (Cabbage) Tree Plantation 
The Pedigree of Lucas provides several figures regarding data ownership that are contradictory. On the map drawn by Herman Moll in 1729, there are depictions of three different Lucas estates: the Lucas estate, which featured three windmills; the Lucas Inn, which can be found just south of where Morris Looby's is located today; and the area near Lynch's above Half Moon Bay, which is approximately where Sheriff's is located today. The Cabadge Tree Plantation was once owned and operated by Colonel William Byam and was located in the Willoughby Bay Division. Col. Rowland Williams sells the same amount of land, 25 acres, to John Pynchan and Samuel Willis Esq. Sugar was produced on the Cabbage Tree Plantation in St. Paul's Parish, Antigua, by Connecticut natives John Samuel Wyllys and Richard Lord. These two men were interested in the industry. 1677: On November 17th, 1677, John sent some pinetree shillings (money from New England) to his cousin Richard Lord of Haratford, instructing him to carry these funds to Antigua "to improve for developing the plan of the Plantation and sugar works there." 1685: On August 15th, 1685, the arbitrators determined that John Lucas was to surrender to the Messrs. Samuel Wyllys and Richard Lord were the proprietors of the property, while John Lucas was the lessee of the property. Wyllys and Lord were caring for four African children named Combo, Mingo, Dick, and Jack who lived on the Cabbage Tree Plantation at the time. Samuel Wyllys was forced to retire from his position on the General Court of Connecticut in 1685 as a result of the financial strain caused by his sugar plantations in Antigua. He later rejoined the court in 1689. It is important to note that all three individuals were linked to one another by means of marriage. John Lucas was Samuel Wyllys' brother-in-law, as was Richard Lord, and Major John Pynchon was married to Amy Wyllys, who was also involved and who withdrew from planting in Antigua in 1689. They were also familiar with the Winthrope family. Will of John Lucas, dated 1673, which reads as follows: "Estate valued at 8,000 pounds I now gift to John Hill my property in Willoughby Bay, Antigua, called "Round Hill," acquired in 1678; and "Cabbage Tree," acquired in 1682." In 1668, John Lucas purchased 25 acres of land; in 1679, he and Richard Travis purchased 600 acres from Jeremiah Watkins; in 1679, John Moore sold John Lucas 122 acres in St. John's Division; in 1680, Ensign Fra. Gifford sold John Lucas 10 acres; in 1680, John Moore sold John Lucas 70 acres and 172 acres; in 1682, Sir William Stapleton sold John Lucas 511 acres. When John Lucas petitioned the Council of Commerce in London in 1699, he ran into conflict with Governor Codrington. This was the beginning of John Lucas' problems. On the 28th of May, 1698, John Lucas writes to his friend Edward Walrond in London, telling him that he had to pay General Codrington £2,000 in libel damages. John Lucas is writing from the Common Goal. Unfortunately, one of his children, who was in the goal with him, passed away. "I have divided the estate of 380 acres that John Yeamans and John Lucas, Esq. have possessed as tenants in common for over 20 years, and the said John Lucas has given his half of the estate to the said George Lucas, who is his son. This was done at the request of Mr. George Lucas as well as the Honorable John Yeamans and John Lucas, Esq." 22 April 1707: Date of the survey. John Lightfoot's will was dated 1758 and read as follows: third portion of a plantation known as Monk's Hill, as well as the entirety of the undivided third portion of a plantation in the parish of Willoughby Bay known as "Roundhill." Cabbage Tree Plantation was held by George Lucas, who served as Governor of Antigua from 1742 until 1747. The property overlooked English Harbour. His daughter Eliza Pinkney, who was born in 1722, spent her childhood on one of the Pinkney family's three plantations on the island of Antigua, known as (Poerest) Cabbage Tree plantation. Molly, Thomas, and George were her younger brothers, and she also had a sister named Molly. Will of John Lucas, who passed away in 1673 "Estate valued at 8,000 pounds I now devise to John Hill my property in Willoughby Bay, Antigua, called "Round Hill," which was obtained in 1678, and "Cabbage Tree," which was bought in 1682," Located in the hills close to Clairmont, this mill may be seen from the Fig Tree Drive road as you get closer to the town.

Cherry Hill 
The view from Cherry Hill extends out over Falmouth Bay. It would appear that a dispute exists regarding land ownership.

Deep Bay 
There was once a windmill at this location, but it has since been demolished, and it is known that cattle were raised on this land. To the north-west, this estate shares a border with the Cherry Hill estate. In the 1960s, the area known as Dieppe Bay was going to be transformed into a hotel, but the project fell bankrupt and was never completed. In later years, it was transformed into a residential neighborhood.

Delaps 
Around the middle of the 1800s, this estate made the switch to steam power. A cistern was created by significantly severing the mill in half, and the remnants of the works may still be found next to the mill. There is a reference to "Little Delaps," which was adjacent to Long Lane and shared its 469 acres and 204 slaves with that property. When the Potworks Dam was built in 1968 and opened on May 28th, 1970, the majority of this Estate was submerged in water. When it is full, it has a length of one mile, a width of half a mile, and it can store one billion gallons of water. The building was put up by the Clarence Johnson Construction Company, which was supervised by a British engineering company and paid for by money from the British government. In order to celebrate the opening of the dam, which was built by Lance Delisle when he was employed by Clarence Johnson Construction Co., a small park was constructed above the dam. "There is a nice pedestal with the date 18 — on it and I was told that it originated from the small bridge that used to be in the region that was dammed up." "When Rosemary Magoris (née Goodwin) was a child, they called it the "whoopee bridge" because when her father would accelerate the automobile over the hump, the whole family would cry out "whoopee!" Potworks was Antigua's first lake, and the surrounding area quickly developed into a popular recreation spot with sailboats and other amenities. In a timely manner, the government intervened to put an end to this practice in order to preserve the water supply. In the event that the weather is dry, it is still possible to travel the road that enters below Yeamans and continues on through the ruins of the Delaps mill all the way to Willoughby Bay. When the dam is at its full capacity, the road will be underwater. 1737: The year 1737 saw the sale of 205 acres by the Honorable George Lucas to Francis Delaps Esq. 1852: 240 acres were owned by John Tollemache Esq. 1756: "John Lavicount inherited in 1756 Long Lane, Delaps and Windward from Benj. King Esq.,". In 1829, Delaps had 240 acres and 250 slaves on its plantation. In the year 1737, the honorable George Lucas sold 205 acres of land to Francis Delaps, esquire. In 1852, John Tollemache, esquire, owned 240 acres of land. 1756: "John Lavicount inherited in 1756 Long Lane, Delaps and Windward from Benj. King Esq.,". In 1829, Delaps had 240 acres and 250 slaves on its plantation. 1866: On January 20th, a letter was delivered to Lord Combermere at Combermere Abbey by a Mr. Hartman who had been dispatched to evaluate the five properties that had recently been acquired. The average yearly island expense for the estate for the past five years was £1,520. This included salaries, wages for laborers, and the cost of all other products. The average harvest for the past five years was between 134 and 143 Hhds. 1851: The Antigua Almanac indicates that John Tollemache was the owner of the 240-acre Delpas property.

Dimsdale 
In later years, this estate was a significant producer of limes, but in addition to that, it kept cattle and grew ground supplies. Rastafarians have enclosed the land surrounding the mill with fencing and turned it into a "grounds" where they produce fruits and vegetables; they either own or lease the land. If you hike in from Patterson's estate, you will find that this location offers some beautiful scenery. "Circa 1667. Falmouth. Captains Joseph Lee, a plantation of 990 acres by patent of Governor Austin, 4 November 1648, and a plantation of 510 acres by will of Capt. Benjamin Langham, deceased, with Michael's Mount by patent from Governor Austin 2 March, 1648, and 19 acres (late Capt. Langham's) by patent from Governor Keynell 20 May 1654. Captains Benjamin Langham's estate also included Michael's Mount by patent from Governor Austin 2 March, 1648. "...and a plantation of 510 acres by will of Capt. Langham, dec. also a plantation of 990 acres" in the year 1667. "Michael's Mount or Deemesdales, which was once owned by Captain Benj. Langham and is located in the Falmouth Division of 275 acres." 1674: Mary Lee received the alias Dimsdale from her father, Langham, and inherited it in 1674. In the year 1684, "Maj. John Boraston, Gent, donated 200 acres called 'Dimsdale' or Michael's Mount, as well as 100 square acres, 10 acres, and 2 1/2 acres." Will of Ashton Warner, drafted in 1750 "My plantation called Clarke's and three black people that I drew from there and put on Staughtons (but none of the slaves bought with Staughtons, nor any of the plantations recently purchased called Nanton's or Dimsdale's...." In the year 1791, it was announced that Dr. Marchant had paid 22,200 pounds to acquire Dimsdale's and Staughton's plantations, which had previously belonged to Tom Warner. In conjunction with Patterson's estate, Dimsdale was a significant grower of limes at the time. Women grated the lime skin, which was then used to generate an oil that was a valuable commodity. The oil was quite expensive. After that, the limes were crushed to get the juice from them. Everything was sent over to England for shipment. This carried on until some time around 1948.

Doig’s (Rendezvous Bay) 
The estate owned by Doig is situated in a breathtaking location off of Rendezvous Bay; but, due to the difficulties in traversing the hills, it has a tendency to be rather isolated. Frequently, people will refer to it as the Rendezvous Bay Estate. Old maps reveal that there was once a road that ran along the coast and entered the area from the west, and there was a trail that ran due north via a break in the hills of Barters that led to Howards and then on to the community of Sweete's. Nowadays, there is a road that runs through Spring Hill Riding Stables that is graded on a regular basis and, when it is in good form, provides access to Rendezvous beach, which has maintained its natural state. 1667: A patent from Governor Bouncle to Thomas White gave Capt. John Cade ownership of 410 acres in Rendezvous Bay in right of his wife. This patent was issued to Thomas White. Thomas White was the one who sold it to Governor Bouncle, and Governor Bouncle ended up giving it to his niece, who was married to the man who said he was the Cade. 1677: Rendezvous. John Fry bestowed a grant of 180 acres on the mountainous north side of Rendezvous Bay. It is unknown whether Doig's or the closeness of.430 In the year 1679, planter Alexander Rollo sold Ensign Robert Smith 21 acres of land in the Rendezvous Bay Division. In the year 1680, Ensign Robert Smith purchases 23 acres of land at Rendezvous Bay from Robert Barker and his wife, Margery. (The Rollo and Smith properties, which encompass a large number of smaller holdings, might have been a component of the Doig or Barter estate.) Members of the Dog Clan from Moneith, Kilmadock Parish, Perthshire, Scotland (Doig, Doigg, Doeg, and Doegge) have their own webpage. "Yield Not to Adversity" and "Na geil do cruaidh-chas" are both Gaelic phrases that mean the same thing. 1668: Ann Doig b.1688, d.May 1st. St. Paul's, Antigua. md. William Franklin (d. 20 Jan., 1721 St. John's, Antigua). The Doig family originated in Brechin, which is located in Angus in Scotland. 1727: In a marriage settlement dated July 1st, 1727 between James Doig born in 1702 and Dorothy Thibou, it states that "in consideration of 1000 pounds sterling as a marriage portion, Ann Franklin grants to Jacob Thibou a plantation in Rendezvous Bay, (Doig's), also 80 acres and a messuage in St. John's Town for the use of herself and James Doig and his heirs, and to pay to Dorothy if she survive her husband. 1742: On April 26th, James Doig made a purchase of 9 gun carriages for 126 pounds sterling. (Minutes of the Council Meeting) In the year 1767, the estate of James Doig, who was still a baby at the time, was valued at 320 acres and 122 slaves. It was said that the land in Doig's held an extraordinary amount of fertility and that it could produce 50 tons of cane per acre (high yield). In order to carry the cane out, it was first transported by donkey to the end of the road near Janie Easton's house. From there, it was loaded onto trucks owned by Charles and driven to the back of Liberta, where it was then transported to the railway siding for shipment to Antigua Sugar Factory. There is a large, dark rock on the land that is about the size of a home and serves as a catchment area when it rains heavily. There is a region to the north-west of Doig's that is known as Upper Doig's, which suggests that it was a secondary estate in the past. It is reported that the ruins of a building that were discovered close to the boundary between Doig's and Barter's properties used to be a distillery, and that people would come there to remove lead pipes that were imbedded in the stone. There is also a deep stone well, 12-15ft. deep. It is estimated that there are 446 acres of land occupied by the ruins now. Cane Returns for the 1941 Crop at the Antigua Sugar Plant, Ltd., located at Rendezvous Bay in 1941. Expected to be 200 tons, with acres of estate and peasants covering an additional acres, and 142 tons of cane delivered. Antigua was the place of death for the final Doig around the 1960s. He was a former clockmaker who resided in St. John's during the time. 1975: St John's Antigua. Charles Joseph, a gardener in his 48th year, was put to death by hanging for the murders of eminent lawyer and politician John Rowan Henry and his wife Gwendolyn. Henry was found dead in their home shortly after the murders were committed. During World War II, John Rowan Henry served in the 37th Air Squadron, which was a Caribbean squadron of the Royal Air Force (RAF). 2000: On the beach at Tuck's Point, in the small bay that is home to Tuck's Point, there are two remains that resemble lime kilns.

Populated places
The parish contains the city of Falmouth. Other populated places include:

 Bethesda
 Burkes
 Christian Hill
 Cobbs Cross
 Delaps
 Dow Hill
 English Harbour
 Liberta
 Marsh Village
 Mathews
 Pattersons
 Piccadilly
 Swetes
 Tyrells

Fort Berkeley is located in the parish, within Nelson's Dockyard national park at Falmouth Harbour.

Demographics (2011)

References

 
Parishes of Antigua and Barbuda
Antigua (island)